Justin Time is a 2010 American direct-to-DVD action teen film. It was released on DVD on March 9, 2010.

Plot
An ancient and magical amulet that has the power to stop time is passed through generations until it ends up in the hands of a young man who must choose to use its power for good or for evil.

Cast
 Chris Laird as Justin
 Brian Wimmer as Uncle Heath
 Danny Trejo as Mardok
 Shareece Pfeiffer as Angelic Romano
 Michael Flynn as Michael Romano
 Alyx Gaudio as Harvey
 Troy Hinckley as Samuel
 Mike Hildebrant as Rudy
 Alex Egbert as Fletcher
 Dave Martinez as Ben
 Matthew Reese as Mr. Black
 J. Omar Hansen as Omar
 Bronzell Miller as Ace
 Cyloie Neal as Bug
 Nano De Silva as Nanju

References

External links

2010 films
2010s science fiction films
2010s English-language films
American direct-to-video films
American teen films
American science fiction action films
2010s American films